The Circus of Antioch was a hippodrome in Antioch, in present-day Turkey. Used for chariot racing, it was modelled on the Circus Maximus in Rome and other circus buildings throughout the Roman Empire.

Characteristics

The Circus, measuring more than 490 m in length and 30 m of width, was similar to the Hippodrome of Berytus.

The circus could house up to 80,000 spectators.

History
There is no consensus about the circus' dating, as it was built and used for several years before its official dedication. It seems to have been built sometime around 50 BCE. 

By the late seventh century CE, it had become decrepit and was replaced by a new arena located nearby (less than 1/5 of a mile to the north); the new arena was called “Hippodrome B” or the “Palestra.”

See also

 List of Roman circuses
 Hippodrome – a Greek arena also used for chariot racing

References

Buildings and structures completed in the 1st century BC
Antioch
Ancient Antioch